7 HOUSE was a Japanese rock music group.  Its members are Hiroki, Kenji, Ogu and Yasunori.

Discography

Singles
 'STOP - Nakanaide' (21 January 1999)
 'LOVE - Dakiatte -' (28 April 1999)
 '0 EDIT' (23 July 1999)
 'Sondemotte KISS' (27 October 1999)
 'Nayamanai Koi ha Nai!' (2 August 2000)
 'Kiseki no Ame' (18 April 2001)
 'Nandeyanen Shinpai Sendemoee' (7 November 2001)

Albums
 ONE BOX (1 December 1999)
 2 - February -  (27 February 2002)

External links
 7 HOUSE - The official website by Zetima

Japanese rock music groups